Tennessee's 22nd Senate district is one of 33 districts in the Tennessee Senate. It has been represented by Republican Bill Powers since a 2019 special election to replace fellow Republican Mark Green.

Geography
District 22 is based in Clarksville, covering all of Houston, Montgomery, and Stewart Counties. Other communities in the district include Needmore, Dover, Erin, and Tennessee Ridge.

The district is located entirely within Tennessee's 7th congressional district, and overlaps with the 67th, 68th, 74th, and 75th districts of the Tennessee House of Representatives. It borders the state of Kentucky.

Recent election results
Tennessee Senators are elected to staggered four-year terms, with odd-numbered districts holding elections in midterm years and even-numbered districts holding elections in presidential years.

2020

2019 special
In November 2018, incumbent Mark Green was elected to Tennessee's 7th congressional district, leaving the 22nd Senate district open. Former senator Rosalind Kurita was appointed as a caretaker until a special election for the seat could be held in April 2019.

2016

2012

Federal and statewide results in District 22

References

22
Houston County, Tennessee
Montgomery County, Tennessee
Stewart County, Tennessee